Anayo is one of 24 parishes (administrative divisions) in Piloña, a municipality within the province and autonomous community of Asturias, in northern Spain.

The population is 128 (INE 2011).

Villages and hamlets
 Capareda (Caparea) 
 Fresnosa 
 Llares
 Robledo (Robleu) 
 Colluenzo 
 La Cuesta Villar 
 Fuentes 
 Pedraces

References

Parishes in Piloña